Charles James Murphy (c.1909 – 6 January 1997), Australian politician, was a Member of the Victorian Legislative Assembly for the electoral district of Hawthorn representing the Labor Party from 1952–1955 and the Australian Labor Party (Anti-Communist) (Democratic Labor Party) from March–April 1955.

References

1900s births
1997 deaths
Australian Labor Party members of the Parliament of Victoria
Democratic Labor Party (historical) members of the Parliament of Victoria
Members of the Victorian Legislative Assembly
20th-century Australian politicians